Dead Christ may refer to:

 Dead Christ (Annibale Carracci), or Corpse of Christ
 Dead Christ (Mantegna), or Lamentation of Christ
 Dead Christ (Palmezzano)